Palam A Stadium, also known as Air Force Station or Model Sports Complex, is a cricket ground in Dwarka Road, Palam, New Delhi. The ground was established in 1958, and since then it has been regular venue for cricket for Services cricket team. The ground has also hosted few matches for the Delhi and Railways cricket teams. As of mid-2018 it has held 126 first-class matches and 69 List A matches. In 2011, the International Cricket Council approved the ground for use as a practice venue for the World Cup; 19 practice sessions took place there.

The ground is very close to Indira Gandhi International Airport, and planes approaching the airport fly low about 100 metres south of the ground before coming in to land on the other side of Dwarka Road. Although the ground is used for Ranji Trophy matches, public entry is restricted, as the land belongs to the Indian Air Force.

References

External links 
 Cricketachive

Sports venues in Delhi
Cricket grounds in Delhi
Sports venues completed in 1958
1958 establishments in Delhi
20th-century architecture in India